The 2023 Fanatec GT World Challenge Europe Sprint Cup will be the eleventh season of the GT World Challenge Europe Sprint Cup following on from the demise of the SRO Motorsports Group's FIA GT1 World Championship (an auto racing series for grand tourer cars), the third with the sponsorship of Fanatec. 

The season will begin on 13 May at Brands Hatch in Kent and will end on 15 October at Circuit Zandvoort in the Netherlands.

Calendar
The provisional calendar was released on July 29, 2022 at the SRO's annual 24 Hours of Spa press conference, featuring five rounds. Several adjustments were announced following the conflict between the Belgian Grand Prix and 24 Hours of Spa. The opening round was moved back two weeks, as was the round at Misano. The event at Zandvoort was moved to the season finale in October.

Entry list

Race results

See also
 2023 British GT Championship
 2023 GT World Challenge Europe
 2023 GT World Challenge Europe Endurance Cup
 2023 GT World Challenge Asia
 2023 GT World Challenge America
 2023 GT World Challenge Australia
 2023 Intercontinental GT Challenge

Notes

References

External links
 

GT World Challenge Europe Sprint Cup
GT World Challenge Europe Sprint Cup